The concept of nitrogen balance is that the difference between nitrogen intake and loss reflects gain or loss of total body protein. If more nitrogen (protein) is given to the patient than lost, the patient is considered to be anabolic or “in positive nitrogen balance"

Nitrogen Balance = Nitrogen intake - Nitrogen loss

Blood urea nitrogen can be used in estimating nitrogen balance, as the urea concentration in urine.

Nitrogen Balance and Protein Metabolism

Nitrogen is a fundamental component of amino acids, which are the molecular building blocks of protein. Therefore, measuring nitrogen inputs and losses can be used to study protein metabolism.

Positive nitrogen balance is associated with periods of growth, hypothyroidism, tissue repair, and pregnancy. This means that the intake of nitrogen into the body is greater than the loss of nitrogen from the body, so there is an increase in the total body pool of protein.

Negative nitrogen balance is associated with burns, serious tissue injuries, fever, hyperthyroidism, wasting diseases, and during periods of fasting. This means that the amount of nitrogen excreted from the body is greater than the amount of nitrogen ingested. A negative nitrogen balance can be used as part of a clinical evaluation of malnutrition.

Nitrogen balance is the traditional method of determining dietary protein requirements. Determining dietary protein requirements using nitrogen balance requires that all nitrogen inputs and losses are carefully collected, to ensure that all nitrogen exchange is accounted for. In order to control nitrogen inputs and losses, nitrogen balance studies usually require participants to eat very specific diets (so total nitrogen intake is known) and stay in the study location for the duration of the study (to collect all nitrogen losses). Because of these conditions, it can be difficult to study the dietary protein requirements of certain populations using the nitrogen balance technique (e.g. children).

Dietary nitrogen, from metabolising proteins and other nitrogen-containing compounds, has been linked to changes in genome evolution. Species which primarily obtain energy from metabolising nitrogen-rich compounds use more nitrogen in their DNA than species which primarily break down carbohydrates for their energy. Dietary nitrogen alters codon bias and genome composition in parasitic microorganisms.

Sources of nitrogen intake include meat, fish, dairy foods, eggs, nuts and legumes, and grains and cereals. Examples of nitrogen losses include urine, feces, sweat, hair, and skin.

See also
 Protein (nutrient)
 Biological value
 Net protein utilization
 Protein efficiency ratio
 Protein digestibility
 Protein Digestibility Corrected Amino Acid Score

References

Nitrogen
Proteins